The Norwegian First Division is the second level of ice hockey in Norway. It is below Fjordkraftligaen and above the 2. divisjon.

Teams
The following ten clubs will compete in the 1.division during the 2018–19 season.

Champions

External links
 Norwegian Ice Hockey Federation

Nor
 
Professional ice hockey leagues in Norway